Barwani State  was a princely state in India. The seat was at Barwani.

History

The state was founded in the 11th or 14th century, at which time it was known as Avasgarh. the Rana's of Avasgarh were Sisodia's who claimed to be the descendants of Bappa Rawal. The records of the state claim that Awasgarh had 51 Rana's however there is little information about their names or the dates they reigned in. Parsan Singh, the 35th Rana was defeated by the Sultan of Delhi and taken as prisoner, the rana agreed to covert to Islam on the condition that he gets his ancestral lands back. 3 of Parsans descendants were Muslims although they followed their Hindu customs, the Rana's eventually converted back to Hinduism. The 41st Rana Chandra Singh moved his capital to the safer position of Barwani. The state lost most of its territory during the Maratha domination in the 17th century, however it never became tributary to any Major power.

Under the British Raj, Barwani was a state of the Bhopawar Agency, a division of the Central India Agency. The state lay in the Satpura Range south of the Narmada River. The average revenue of the state was Rs.4,00,000. The inhabitants were predominantly Bhil tribals. The forests were under a British official.

After India's independence in 1947, the Rana of Barwani acceded to India, and Barwani became part of the Nimar District of Madhya Bharat state. Madhya Bharat was merged into Madhya Pradesh on 1 November 1956.

Rulers
Barwani State was an 9 gun salute state. The rulers of the State, whose title was Rana, were Rajputs of the Sisodia clan, descended from the ruling dynasty of Udaipur.

Ranas
       1675 -        1700  Jodh Singh                         (d. 1700)
       1700 -        1708  Parbat Singh                       (d. 1708)
       1708 -        1730  Mohan Singh I                      (d. 1731)
       1730 -        1760  Anup Singh                         (d. 1760)
       1760 -        1794  Umed Singh                         (d. 1794)
       1794 -        1839  Mohan Singh II                     (d. 1839)
       1839 -        1861  Jashwant Singh (1st time)          (d. 1880)
       1861 -        1873  vacant
       1873 -        1880  Jashwant Singh (2nd time)
 15 Aug 1880 -        1894  Indrajit Singh                     (d. 1894)
 14 Dec 1894 – 21 Apr 1930  Ranjit Singh                       (b. 1888 – d. 1930)
 21 Apr 1930 – 15 Aug 1947  Devi Sahib Singhji                 (b. 1922 – d. 2007)

See also
Bhopawar Agency
Political integration of India

References

External links

Princely states of India
Princely states of Madhya Pradesh
States and territories disestablished in 1948
1948 disestablishments in India
Rajputs
836 establishments
Barwani district
9th-century establishments in India